Ezzell may refer to:

 Homer Ezzell, American baseball player
 Ezzell Independent School District, American public school district